Lysergol is an alkaloid of the ergoline family that occurs as a minor constituent in some species of fungi (most within Claviceps), and in the morning glory family of plants (Convolvulaceae), including the hallucinogenic seeds of Rivea corymbosa (ololiuhqui), Argyreia nervosa (Hawaiian baby woodrose) and Ipomoea violacea. Lysergol is not a controlled substance in the USA. Its possession and sale is also legal under the U.S. Federal Analog Act because it does not have a known pharmacological action or a precursor relationship to LSD, which is a controlled substance. However, lysergol is an intermediate in the manufacture of some ergoloid medicines (e.g., nicergoline).

Lysergol can be synthesised using a tandem reaction to construct the piperidine skeleton and a rhodium-catalyzed [3 + 2] annulation in the late-stage indole formation.

See also 
 Lysergic acid
 Ipomoea tricolor

References

External links 
   Hoffman, A. Teonanácatl and Ololiuqui, two ancient magic drugs of Mexico Bulletin on Narcotics 1971 1 3
 Mixing the kykeon -- P. Webster, D. M. Perrine & C.A.P. Ruck
 TiHKAL (A & A Shulgin) #26
 Erowid's LSA Vault

Ergot alkaloids
Serotonin receptor agonists